John Morehead Scott (1 January 1839 - 18 June 1862) was a sergeant in the United States Army who was awarded the Medal of Honor for gallantry during the American Civil War. Scott was awarded the medal posthumously on 27 April 1865 for actions performed during the Great Locomotive Chase on 12 April 1862.

Personal life 
Scott was born in Stark County, Ohio on 1 January 1839 to parents Thomas B. Scott and Elizabeth Moorehead Scott, one of 6 children. He married Rachel M. Davis Waggoner in 1861. Following the Great Locomotive Chase, Scott was hung along with 7 others in Atlanta, Georgia and was buried in Marietta National Cemetery. He was later reburied in Chattanooga National Cemetery.

Military service 
Scott enlisted in the Army as a sergeant on 6 September 1861 at Findlay, Hancock County, Ohio. He was mustered into Company F of the 21st Ohio Infantry on 19 September 1861. He was one of 7 men executed by the Confederates for espionage. He was posthumously awarded the Medal of Honor on August 4, 1866.

Scott's Medal of Honor citation reads:

References 

1839 births
1862 deaths
19th-century executions of American people
American Civil War recipients of the Medal of Honor
United States Army Medal of Honor recipients
Great Locomotive Chase
People of Ohio in the American Civil War
People executed by the Confederate States of America by hanging